Nakhchivan is the capital of the eponymous Nakhchivan Autonomous Republic of Azerbaijan, located  west of Baku. The municipality of Nakhchivan consists of the city of Nakhchivan, the settlement of Əliabad and the villages of Başbaşı, Bulqan, Haciniyyət, Qaraçuq, Qaraxanbəyli, Tumbul, Qarağalıq, and Daşduz.

Toponymy 
The city's official Azerbaijani spelling is "Nakhchivan". The name is transliterated from Persian as Nakhjavan. The city's name is transliterated from Russian as Nakhichevan' and from Armenian as Nakhijevan.

The city was first mentioned in Ptolemy's Geography as Naxuana. The older form of the name is Naxčawan. According to philologist Heinrich Hübschmann, the name was originally borne by the city and later given to the surrounding region. Hübschmann believed the name to be composed of Naxič or Naxuč (probably a personal name) and awan, an Armenian word (ultimately of Iranian origin) meaning "place, town".

It was probably under the influence of this tradition that the name changed in Armenian from the older Naxčawan to Naxijewan. Although this is a folk etymology, William Whiston believed Nakhchivan/Nakhijevan to be the Apobatērion ("place of descent") mentioned by the first-century Jewish historian Flavius Josephus in connection with Noah's Ark, which would make the tradition connecting the name with the Biblical figure Noah very old, predating Armenia's conversion to Christianity in the early fourth century.

History

Classical period 
In the Armenian tradition, Nakhchivan was founded by Noah after the Flood, and was the place of his death and burial. According to the Armenian historian Movses Khorenatsi, King Tigranes I of Armenia settled Median prisoners of war at Nakhchivan in the second century BC. Nakhchivan is first mentioned in Ptolemy's Geographia as Naxuana.

Nakhchivan was destroyed by Shahanshah Shapur II in 363 and its Armenian and Jewish population was deported to Iran. Emperor Heraclius travelled through the city en route to Atropatene in 623 during the Byzantine–Sasanian War of 602–628.

Medieval period 
The Arab siege of Nakhchivan in 650 led Theodore Rshtuni to conclude a truce. After the rebellion of 703, Muhammad ibn Marwan had the rebel nobles burnt alive in churches in Nakhchivan and Goghtn in 705. Nakhchivan temporarily came under the control of the Bagratid Kingdom of Armenia in c. 900, but was swiftly taken by Muhammad ibn Abi'l-Saj. The city was the temporary refuge of Atabeg Nusrat al-Din Abu Bakr after his defeat at the Battle of Shamkor in 1195, and Nakhchivan was conquered by the Kingdom of Georgia in 1197.

In 1225, Nakhchivan was ruled by al-Maleka al-Jalāliya, daughter of Atabeg Muhammad Jahan Pahlavan. Genoese merchants were known to trade in the city by 1280. The city was conquered by Timur in 1401, but was taken by King George VII of Georgia in 1405.

Modern period 

Nakhchivan was conquered by Shahanshah Ismail I in 1503. Shahanshah Abbas I of Persia reconquered Nakhchivan from the Ottoman Empire in 1603–1604.

Nakhchivan was annexed to the Russian Empire per the Treaty of Turkmenchay in 1828. The city became the centre of the Nakhichevan uezd of the Erivan Governorate in 1849. In 1896, Nakhchivan had a population of 7,433, roughly two-thirds of which were Azeri-speaking Muslims and one-third Armenian Christians. According to the 1897 census, Nakhchivan had the status of a county town.

After the February Revolution of 1917, a soviet was formed in Nakhchivan, but the city was under the control of the Special Transcaucasian Committee from March to November 1917, and its successor the Transcaucasian Commissariat from November 1917 to March 1918. Turkey occupied Nakhchivan from June until November, after which the city was occupied by British soldiers in January 1919, and a military governor was appointed to administer Nakhchivan.

It was decided that Nakhchivan would be granted to Armenia on 6 April 1919, and the city was annexed on 6 June 1919, however, some months later the city became the center of a regional Muslim uprising and pogrom against its Armenian inhabitants. Britain, France, Italy, and the US, with approval from Armenia and Azerbaijan, agreed on 25 October 1919 to appoint American Colonel Edmond D. Daily as General-Governor of Nakhchivan, elections would be held, and both Armenia and Azerbaijan would withdraw its forces from the territory. However, in March 1920, Turkish forces led by Kâzım Karabekir occupied Nakhchivan.

Soviet Russia took control of Nakhchivan on 28 July 1920, and the city became part of the newly formed Nakhchivan Autonomous Soviet Socialist Republic. The Treaty of Moscow of 16 March 1921, and later the Treaty of Kars of 21 October 1921, between Soviet Union and Turkey agreed that Nakhicheva would be an autonomous territory under the protection of Azerbaijan and delimited its borders with Turkey. In February 1923, the city formed part of the Nakhchivan Autonomous Krai within the Azerbaijan Soviet Socialist Republic (ASSR), but later became the capital of the Nakhchivan Autonomous Soviet Socialist Republic within the ASSR in March 1924.

When Azerbaijan declared independence from the Soviet Union, Nakhchivan remained part of the Republic of Azerbaijan. Following the 2020 Nagorno-Karabakh war, a trilateral ceasefire was signed between Armenia, Azerbaijan and Russia. According to the agreement, Azerbaijan will gain a road access to Nakhchivan through Armenia which will be secured by Russian peacekeepers.

Since 9 June 2009, the Bulqan, Qaraçuq, Qaraxanbəyli, Tumbul and Haciniyyət villages of the Babek District are included in the scope of the administrative-territorial unit of the Nakhchivan city.

Ecclesiastical history
The bishop of Mardpetakan resided at Nakhchivan, and the Armenian historian Tovma Artsruni records Sahak Vahevuni as bishop of Nakhchivan and Mardpetakan and brother of Apusahak Vahevuni.

Geography
The city is spread over the foothills of Zangezur chain, on the right bank of the Nakhchivan River at an altitude of almost . The floods and soil erosion spiked because of the decreased forest cover along riverbanks. As a result, reforestation projects implemented in the city to encourage tree planting.

Climate
Nakhchivan has a continental semi-arid climate (Köppen BSk) with short but cold, snowy winters and long, dry, very hot summers.

Population
According to the State Statistics Committee of Azerbaijan, the number of population of city was 63,8 thousand in 2000.

Demographics

Economy 

Traditionally, Nakhchivan was home to trade industry, handicraft, shoemaking and hatmaking by Azerbaijanians. These industries have been largely replaced. The restoration enterprises and development industry, liberalization of foreign trade and the extension of the customs infrastructure, which has been largely responsible for Nakchivan's growth in the last two decades, are now major parts of Nakchivan's economy.

Culture
The city has a wide range of cultural activities, amenities and museums. Heydar Aliyev Palace, which has a permanent local painting exhibition and a theatre hall for an audience of 1000 people, and a recently restored Soviet-time Opera Theatre where the Nakhchivan State Musical Drama Theatre realises theatre plays, concerts, musicals and opera.

Many of the city's cultural sites were celebrated in 2018 when Nakhchivan was designated an Islamic Culture Capital.

Architecture 

The city is home Momine Khatun Mausoleum, Gulustan Mausoleum, Noah's Mausoleum, Garabaghlar Mausoleum, Yusif ibn Kuseyir Mausoleum, Imamzadeh mausoleum and Mausoleum of Huseyn Javid mausoleums.

The main sight in the city is the heavily restored 12th-century Momine Khatun Mausoleum, also known as Atabek Gumbezi. Momine Khatun was the wife of Eldegizid Atabek Jahan Pahlivan, ruler of the Atabek Eldegiz emirate. The 10-sided monument is decorated with intricate geometrical motives and Kufic script, it uses turquoise glazed bricks. It shares the neighbourhood with a statue of its architect – Ajami Nakhchivani – and a bust of Heydar Aliyev. Also from the 12th century and by the same architect, is the octagonal Yusuf Ibn Kuseir tomb, known as Atababa, half abandoned near the main cemetery.

In 1993, the white marble mausoleum of Hussein Javid was built. The Azerbaijani writer died in the Gulag during Joseph Stalin's Great Purge. Both the mausoleum and his house museum are located east of the theatre. Although being a recent construction, Huseyn Javid's mausoleum is of great iconic importance, representing the ability of the exclave to live despite the Armenian embargo and becoming a symbol of Nakhchivan itself.

The mausoleums of Nakhchivan were entered for possible inclusion in the List of World Heritage Sites, UNESCO in 1998 by Gulnara Mehmandarova – president of Azerbaijan Committee of ICOMOS—International Council on Monuments and Sites.

Cuisine

Nakchivan’s signature cuisine includes shirin plov (sweet rice with gravy; made with mutton, hazelnuts, almonds and dried fruits), dastana, komba, tendir lavash and galin.

Lavash is made with flour, water, and salt. The thickness of the bread varies depending on how thin it was rolled out. Toasted sesame seeds and/or poppy seeds are sometimes sprinkled on before baking. It is impossible to imagine any table without bread in Azerbaijan and also in Nakhchivan. In connection with this, the assortment of bread in Nakhchivan is different; the tendir lavash as thin as paper, galin (thick), dastana, and komba (ash cake). If prepared to saj it was called lavash, "Juha salmag" – spread Juha, lavash bread on saj, and if prepared in the tandir, the "llavash yapmag" lavash bread stick. The fact is that it was necessary to stick lavash bread on the hot inner walls of the tandir.
it is impossible to fight with lavash bread, as the proverb reads "Gyaldi lavash – Bitdili Savas" – "Came lavash – the end of the war". There are many people’s ideological expressions about lavash "Yavash-yavash -pendir- lavash " "Quietly (slow) – cheese lavash " or "Khamrali hash – bagryna bass", "Khamraliev" (kind of bread) push to the chest, i.e. . lavash bread – eat slowly. "Of lavash folk sandwiches are made in a roll shape – durmek. In the village where children ran out to play or school they were supplied with these sandwiches. Inside durmeks – rolls was put butter and jam, cheese, cottage cheese and butter, cheese with herbs, potatoes, boiled eggs, etc."

Sacrificial monument Ashabi-Kahf

Ashabi-Kahf  is a sanctuary in a natural cave which is located in the eastern part of the city of Nakhchivan, between the mountains of Ilandag and Nahajir in Azerbaijan.Since ancient times Ashabi-Kahf is considered as a sacred place.It is known not only in Nakhchivan, but also in other regions of Azerbaijan and countries of the Middle East.Each year ten thousands of people make a pilgrimage to this place.

Museums and galleries
The city also has many historical museums, the literature museum of Nakhchivan Autonomous Republic, Nakhchivan State History Museum, The Nakhchivan State Carpet Museum, and the house museums of Jamshid Nakhchivanski and Bahruz Kangarli. There is also an archaeological museum found on Istiqlal street. The city has a few interesting mosques, particularly the Juma mosque, with its large dome.

Modern museums in Nakchivan include the Museum under Open Air, Heydar Aliyev Museum and the Memorial Museum (Xatıra Muzeyi), dedicated to the national strife between Armenia and Azerbaijan.

Music and media
The regional channels Naxçıvan TV and Kanal 35, and newspaper Sharg Gapisi are headquartered in the city.

Sports
Araz Naxçivan one of the top futsal clubs in the European futsal arena and regularly participates in UEFA Futsal Cup.

Nakhchivan had one professional football team, Araz-Naxçıvan, which competed in the top-flight of Azerbaijani football, the Azerbaijan Premier League.

In 2014, the city hosted Masters Weightlifting World Cup.

Festivals 
Nakhchivan is known for its "Goyja" fruit, sort of a cherry-plum, and hosts a traditional Goyja festival at the Nakhchivangala Historical-Architectural Museum Complex. Products made from goyja—jam, compote (drink), pickles, dried, lavasha (bread) – are shown at the festival.

Another festival organized annually in Nakhchivan is associated with kata – flat pie with greens, which is made with shomu (wild spinach), mixed greens, desert candle, pumpkin, asphodel, nettle, bean or lentil in a dough wrapped in the shape of an envelope and cooked in a tandir. Kata festival is aimed to show and promote the preparation manner of various types of the kata specific to different regions of NAR. The festival is held at the Historical-Architectural Museum Complex "Nakhchivangala" in April.

Education
There are 3 professional, 6 musical, 22 secondary schools and a military cadet school in Nakhchivan administered by the city council.

Universities and colleges

Nakhchivan is home to numerous universities:
 Nakhchivan State University
 Nakhchivan Private University
 Nakhchivan Teachers Institute

Transport

Public transport

Nakhchivan's trolleybus system consisted of three lines at its height and existed until 2004.

Air

Nakhchivan International Airport is the only commercial airport serving Nakhchivan. The airport is connected by bus to the city center. There are domestic flights to Baku and international service to Russia and Turkey.

Rail
Currently, a light rail line operates from Nakhchivan southeast to Ordubad and northwest to Sharur.

Notable residents

The city's notable residents include: president of Azerbaijan Heydar Aliyev, Huseyn Javid – poet and playwright, founder of the progressive romanticism in Azerbaijani literature, writer Jalil Mammadguluzadeh, opera singer Azer Zeynalov, film director Rza Tahmasib, generals Huseyn Khan Nakhchivanski and Jamshid Nakhchivanski, artist Bahruz Kangarli and architect Ajami Nakhchivani.

International relations

Twin towns 
Nakhchivan is twinned with various cities.
  Batumi, Georgia,

Gallery

See also 
 Nakhchivan Khanate - Turkic Khanate which ruled over the region in 18th century
 Thamanin in southeast Turkey

Notes

References

Bibliography

External links 

 Nakhchivan Guide
 Nakhchivan Portal
 
 World Gazetteer: Azerbaijan – World-Gazetteer.com

 
Populated places in Azerbaijan
Districts of Azerbaijan
Subdivisions of the Nakhchivan Autonomous Republic
Erivan Governorate
Mount Ararat